WJMD (104.7 FM) is a radio station  broadcasting a Contemporary Christian format. It is licensed to Hazard, Kentucky, United States. The station is currently owned by Hazard Broadcasting, Inc. and features programming from Salem Communications.

References

External links

JMD
Hazard, Kentucky